Cadillac·Shanghai Concert Hall is located on the intersection of Yan'an Road and South Tibet Road of Huangpu District, Shanghai. It was founded in 1930 as Nanking Theatre. In 1949, its name was changed to Beijing Cinema. In 1959, it was renamed Shanghai Concert Hall.

The hall can accommodate 1,122 seats, 640 on the ground floor and 482 on the second floor. The stage is 8.35 metres by 16 metres, covering around 100 sq. metres.

The Concert Hall was designed by Chinese architect Fan Wenzhao (范文照) in European style.

In order to make way for Yan'an Elevated Road, the hall was relocated in 2007. The project embarked at 10 am on April 15, and cost 50 million RMB. The 5,800 ton concert hall was first lifted 1.7 meters, moved east 66.4 meters, and finally lifted another 1.7 meters at the new site, using Enerpac hydraulic cylinders. The project concluded on January 1, 2008. The Shanghai Concert Hall reopened on September 26, 2008.

References

External links
Official website

Buildings and structures in Shanghai
Performing arts venues in Shanghai
1930 establishments in China
Concert halls in China